Epiperipatus is the most diverse genus of neotropical velvet worms in the family Peripatidae. Species in this genus are found in Central and South America. Velvet worms in this genus can have as few as 23 pairs of legs (in E. hyperbolicus) or as many as 39 leg pairs (in E. titanicus). This genus is viviparous, with mothers supplying nourishment to their embryos through a placenta.

Species 
The genus contains the following thirty species:

 Epiperipatus acacioi (Marcus & Marcus, 1955)
 Epiperipatus adenocryptus Oliveira et al., 2011
 Epiperipatus barbadensis (Froehlich, 1962)
 Epiperipatus barbouri (Brues, 1911)
 Epiperipatus beckeri Costa, Chagas & Pinto-da-Rocha, 2018
 Epiperipatus bernali Costa & Giribet, 2021
 Epiperipatus betheli (Cockerell, 1913)
 Epiperipatus biolleyi (Bouvier, 1902)
 Epiperipatus brasiliensis (Bouvier, 1899)
 Epiperipatus broadwayi (Clark, 1913)
 Epiperipatus cratensis Brito et al., 2010
 Epiperipatus diadenoproctus Oliveira et al., 2011
 Epiperipatus edwardsii (Blanchard, 1847)
 Epiperipatus evansi (Bouvier, 1904)
 Epiperipatus hilkae Morera-Brenes and Monge-Najera, 1990
 Epiperipatus hyperbolicus Costa, Chagas & Pinto-da-Rocha, 2018
 Epiperipatus imthurni (Sclater, 1888)
 Epiperipatus isthmicola (Bouvier, 1902)
 Epiperipatus lewisi (Arnett, 1961)
 Epiperipatus lucerna Costa, Chagas & Pinto-da-Rocha, 2018
 Epiperipatus machadoi (Oliveira & Wieloch, 2005)
 Epiperipatus marajoara Costa, Chagas & Pinto-da-Rocha, 2018
 Epiperipatus ohausi (Bouvier, 1900) 
 Epiperipatus paurognostus Oliveira et al., 2011
 Epiperipatus simoni (Bouvier, 1898)
 Epiperipatus titanicus Costa, Chagas & Pinto-da-Rocha, 2018
 Epiperipatus torrealbai Scorza, 1953
 Epiperipatus trinidadensis (Sedgwick, 1888)
 Epiperipatus vagans (Brues, 1925)
 Epiperipatus vespucci Brues, 1914

Epiperipatus nicaraguensis (Bouvier, 1900) and Epiperipatus tucupi (Froehlich, 1968) are considered nomina dubia by Oliveira et al. 2012.

References 

Onychophorans of tropical America
Onychophoran genera